Erysimum odoratum is a species of flowering plant belonging to the family Brassicaceae.

Its native range is Central Europe to Ukraine.

References

odoratum
Taxa named by Jakob Friedrich Ehrhart